El amor las vuelve locas (English title: Love makes them crazy) is a Venezuelan telenovela produced by Venevisión in 2005. The series is a remake of the telenovela Contra viento y marea written by Leonardo Padrón, and this new version was adapted by Alberto Gómez. The telenovela lasted for 151 episodes and was distributed internationally by Venevisión International.

Lilibeth Morillo and Carlos Montilla starred as the main protagonists with Jorge Aravena, Fabiola Colmenares and Loly Sánchez as antagonists.

Plot
For 20 years, Fernanda has been unhappily married to Arnaldo, a wealthy and cruel man who is a womanizer and disregards Fernanda's feelings. While she was 18, Fernanda was in love with Pablo and they planned to marry. However, the brutal murder of her older brother changed Fernanda's life forever, as Pablo was accused of the crime. Through the evil schemes of her family, especially her overbearing mother, they convinced her that Pablo was dead and forced her into marrying Arnaldo.

Destiny brings her face to face with her past lover Pablo who has been released from prison, determined to exact revenge on those who falsely accused him and clear his name of the crime he was accused of. On seeing Pablo, Fernanda finds herself at a crossroads where she has conflicting feelings- on one hand, she is stuck in a dead marriage to a man she doesn't love, while on the other, she can find true happiness again with her past lover. Furthermore, Fernanda has been hiding a terrible secret. Her daughter, Ana Maria, is not Arnaldo's as everyone thinks, but Pablo's.

These two will have to face the lies, conflicts and sources that prevent them from regaining true happiness and love.

Cast

Main 
 Lilibeth Morillo as Fernanda Santana de Arismendi
 Carlos Montilla as Pablo Martínez
 Jorge Aravena as Arnaldo Arismendi
 Fabiola Colmenares as Raquel Espina
 Marisa Román as Vanessa Montilla
 Juan Carlos García as Guillermo "Memo" Morales
 Ana Karina Casanova as Ana María Arismendi Santana

Secondary 

 Nohely Arteaga as Mara Montilla
 Beatriz Valdés as Scarlett Conde
 Henry Soto as Eduardo Córdova
 Yanis Chimaras as Luciano Santibáñez
 Gledys Ibarra as Irene Pérez
 Roberto Lamarca as Tobías San Juan
 Tania Sarabia as Olvido
 Beba Rojas as Lily Fajardo
 Alberto Alifa as Ignacio Aguirre
 Milena Santander as Pastora Cabrera
 Carmen Julia Álvarez as Amparo
 Chony Fuentes as Yolanda
 Loly Sánchez as Maximiliana Santana
 Daniela Bascopé as Rosaura Escobar
 Luis Gerónimo Abreu as Emilio Aldana
 María Antonieta Duque as Amapola Castillo
 Carlos Augusto Maldonado as Carliño Costera
 Fernando Villate as Goliath González
 Rhandy Piñango as Alex
 Claudia La Gatta as Cristina Caudal
 Erika Schwarzgruber as Abigaíl

References

External links

2005 telenovelas
Venevisión telenovelas
2005 Venezuelan television series debuts
Venezuelan telenovelas
2005 Venezuelan television series endings
Spanish-language telenovelas
Television shows set in Caracas